The McCallum–Tomkins Medal is an Australian rules football honour awarded annually since 2009 to the fairest and most brilliant player in the South Australian National Football League (SANFL) under-18 competition, as judged by field umpires. The award is a merger of the McCallum Medal, previously awarded for the former SANFL under-17 competition and the Tomkins Medal, previously awarded for the former SANFL under-19 competition.

References 

Australian rules football awards
South Australian National Football League
Awards established in 2009